Giles Eyre (1689–1749) was an Anglican priest in Ireland in the eighteenth century.

His father John Eyre of Eyrecourt Castle (died 1741) was a grandson of John Eyre, the Cromwellian settler in Galway. He was educated at Trinity College, Dublin. He was Archdeacon of Ross from 1716 to 1749; Chancellor of Cork from 1717 to 1730; Dean of Killaloe from 1728 until his death; Prebendary of Clonfert from 1730 to 1750; and Treasurer of Kilmacduagh from 1737 until his death.

His son was an Irish politician.

Notes

External links

Alumni of Trinity College Dublin
Deans of Killaloe
18th-century Irish Anglican priests
1689 births
1749 deaths
Archdeacons of Ross, Ireland